Edward Hardmond Whitlow (1832 – 29 November 1870) was an English cricketer who emigrated to Australia. Born in Broughton, Salford, he was a member of Manchester Cricket Club, playing in two first-class cricket matches for them between 1852 and 1854. He emigrated to Australia and played one first-class match for Victoria in 1859. Whitlow was a medium pace right arm roundarm bowler. He took four wickets with a best return of two for 60. He scored 32 runs with a highest innings of 10.

References

1832 births
1870 deaths
English cricketers
Victoria cricketers
Manchester Cricket Club cricketers
Melbourne Cricket Club cricketers